On 4 August 2020, a large amount of ammonium nitrate stored at the Port of Beirut in the capital city of Lebanon exploded, causing at least 218 deaths, 7,000 injuries, and US$15 billion in property damage, as well as leaving an estimated 300,000 people homeless. A cargo of 2,750 tonnes of the substance (equivalent to around 1.1 kilotons of TNT) had been stored in a warehouse without proper safety measures for the previous six years after having been confiscated by the Lebanese authorities from the abandoned ship . The explosion was preceded by a fire in the same warehouse.

The blast was so powerful that it physically shook the whole country of Lebanon. It was detected by the United States Geological Survey as a seismic event of magnitude 3.3 and is considered one of the most powerful accidental artificial non-nuclear explosions in history.

The Lebanese government declared a two-week state of emergency in response to the disaster. In its aftermath, protests erupted across Lebanon against the government for their failure to prevent the disaster, joining a larger series of protests which had been taking place across the country since 2019. On 10 August 2020, Prime Minister Hassan Diab and the Lebanese cabinet resigned.

The adjacent grain silos were badly damaged. In July and August 2022, part of the silos collapsed following a weeks-long fire in the remaining grain.

Background

The economy of Lebanon was in a state of crisis before the explosion, with the government having defaulted on debt, the Lebanese pound plunging, and a poverty rate that had risen past 50%. In addition, the COVID-19 pandemic had overwhelmed many of the country's hospitals, several of which were already short of medical supplies and unable to pay staff due to the financial crisis. The morning before the explosion, the head of the Rafik Hariri University Hospital, which served as the main COVID-19 medical facility in Lebanon, warned that it was approaching full capacity.

The government-owned Port of Beirut serves as the main maritime entry point into Lebanon and a vital piece of infrastructure for the importation of scarce goods. The Beirut Naval Base is a part of the port. The port included four basins, sixteen quays, twelve warehouses, a large container terminal, and a grain elevator with a total capacity of 120,000 tonnes that served as a strategic reserve of cereals for the country. The grain elevator was built in the 1960s as part of an expansion plan advanced by Palestinian banker Yousef Beidas.

MV Rhosus

On 27 September 2013, the Moldovan-flagged cargo ship  set sail from Batumi, Georgia, to Beira, Mozambique, carrying  of ammonium nitrate. Rhosus was owned by a company based in Panama but was regarded by the captain as under the de facto ownership of Russian businessman Igor Grechushkin. The shipment had been ordered by an African explosives manufacturing company for mining in Mozambique. However, reporting by Der Spiegel has found that it was not Grechushkin who owned Rhosus, but rather Cypriot businessman Charalambos Manoli, who maintained a relationship with the bank used by Hezbollah in Lebanon.

On 21 November 2013, the ship made port in Beirut. Some sources said it was forced to port due to mechanical issues and possibly engine problems, while other sources claimed the owner did not have sufficient funds to pay tolls for the Suez Canal and attempted to take on a shipment of heavy machinery in Beirut. The heavy machinery was stacked on top of the doors to the cargo space containing the ammonium nitrate, causing the doors to buckle, which damaged the ship. After inspection by port state control, Rhosus was deemed unseaworthy, and was forbidden to set sail. Eight Ukrainians and one or two Russians were aboard, and with the help of the Ukrainian consul, five Ukrainians were repatriated, leaving four crew members to care for the ship.

Grechushkin reportedly went bankrupt, and after the charterers lost interest in the cargo he abandoned Rhosus. The ship soon ran out of provisions, and the remaining crew were unable to disembark due to immigration restrictions. According to Lloyd's List, port state control seized Rhosus on 4February 2014 due to US$100,000 in unpaid bills. The ship had accrued port fees and been fined for refusing cargo. Lawyers argued for the crew's repatriation on compassionate grounds because of the danger posed by the cargo still aboard the ship, and an Urgent Matters judge in Beirut allowed them to return home. They had been forced to live aboard the ship for about a year.

By order of the judge, Rhosuss cargo was brought ashore in 2014 and placed in Warehouse 12 at the port, where it remained for the next six years. Rhosus sank in the harbor in February 2018.

Lebanese customs officials had sent letters to judges requesting a resolution to the issue of the confiscated cargo, proposing that the ammonium nitrate be either exported, given to the Lebanese Armed Forces or sold to the private Lebanese Explosives Company. Letters had been sent on 27 June and 5 December 2014, 6 May 2015, 20 May and 13 October 2016, and 27 October 2017. One of the letters sent in 2016 noted that judges had not replied to previous requests, and pleaded:

Explosion

Fire and first explosion
Around 17:45 local time (14:45 UTC) on 4 August 2020, a fire broke out in Warehouse 12 at the Port of Beirut. Warehouse 12, which was waterside and adjacent to the grain elevator, stored the ammonium nitrate that had been confiscated from Rhosus alongside a stash of fireworks. Around 17:55 local time (14:55 UTC), a team of nine firefighters and one paramedic, known as Platoon 5, was dispatched to fight the fire. On arrival the fire crew reported there was "something wrong" as the fire was immense and produced "a crazy sound."

The initial explosion, at about 18:07 local time (15:07 UTC), likely triggered by the stored fireworks, sent up a large cloud of smoke and a crackle of bright firework flashes, and heavily damaged the structure of Warehouse 12 with a force equivalent to around 1.5–2.5 tons of TNT.

Final explosion

It rocked central Beirut and sent a red-orange cloud into the air, which was briefly surrounded by a white condensation cloud. The red-orange color of the smoke was caused by nitrogen dioxide, a byproduct of ammonium nitrate decomposition.

By the next morning, the main fire that led to the explosion had been extinguished.

Yield

Despite inefficient transmission of the shock waves into the ground, the United States Geological Survey measured the event as a 3.3 local magnitude earthquake, while the Jordan Seismological Observatory reported that it was equivalent to a 4.5 local magnitude earthquake. A study of seismic signatures of the explosion by the Federal Institute for Geosciences and Natural Resources in Germany produced a yield estimate between 0.5 and 1.1 kt of TNT. Experts from the Blast and Impact Research Group at the University of Sheffield estimated that the explosion was one of the largest artificial non-nuclear explosions ever recorded. Later, they were able to quantitatively support this rapid estimate as they compiled more distance versus time of arrival data as new videos of the explosion became available on social media platforms. Their study found that a best estimate and upper bound prediction of the yield of the explosion are 0.5 and 1.12 kt of TNT, respectively. This is equal to around 1 GWh of energy. Another study used several videos of the explosion to describe the evolution of the fireball size and estimated the Beirut explosion yield to be 0.6 ± 0.3 kt of TNT. The Beirut explosion was similar to explosions of large amounts of ammonium nitrate in Tianjin, China, in 2015; in Texas City, United States, in 1947; or in Toulouse, France, in 2001.

An independent estimate by the International Monitoring System of the Comprehensive Nuclear-Test-Ban Treaty Organization based on infrasonic data obtained an explosive yield equivalent to 0.5–1.1 kt of TNT, making it the sixth-largest accidental artificial non-nuclear explosion in human history.

Aouad et al. (2021) derived the kinematics of the fireball from publicly available videos. Considering a time of separation between the fireball and the shock wave at about 170 milliseconds, they concluded a TNT equivalent mass of 0.2 +/- 0.08 kt of TNT or 520 +/- 200 tons of ammonium nitrate at a distance of 130 meters from the explosion center. This result is consistent with Dewey 2021 that suggests that the Beirut explosion TNT equivalence is an increasing function of distance.

Temsah et al. 2021 estimated the magnitude of the explosion. The research was based on a structural engineering approach with numerical non-linear finite element modeling of the grain elevator facing Warehouse 12 where the explosion took place. The numerical study model was based on silos data (geometrical and material properties) and the use of the Conventional Weapons Effects Blast Loading (CONWEP), and the Coupled Eulerian-Lagrangian (CEL) methods to generate the blast load. The analysis results proved that an amount equivalent to 564 t of AN (or 220 t of TNT) was adequate to generate damages similar to those resulting from the explosion. This amount represents 20.5% of the original stored amount (2750 t). As for the state of the grain elevator, results showed it was structurally unstable and should be demolished or properly strengthened.

Cause
Warehouses at the Port of Beirut were used to store explosives and chemicals including nitrates, which are common components of fertilizers and explosives. The General Director of General Security, Major General Abbas Ibrahim, said the ammonium nitrate confiscated from Rhosus had exploded. The failure to remove the materials from the warehouse and relocate them was attributed to mismanagement of the port, corruption of the government, and inaction of the flag registry's country and ship owner.

The Lebanese Broadcasting Corporation International (LBCI) reported that, according to attendees of a Higher Defence Council briefing, the fire was ignited by workers welding a door at a warehouse. A former port worker said that "[t]here were 30 to 40 nylon bags of fireworks inside warehouse 12" that he had personally seen. An American diplomatic cable on 7 August said it "remains unclear ... whether fireworks, ammunition or something else stored next to the ammonium nitrate might have been involved" in worsening the warehouse fire and igniting the ammonium nitrate. A port worker said Warehouse 12 was "not in regular use", and that "those in charge only used to open the warehouse to stack inside it materials confiscated upon judicial orders or perilous products", though he had not seen this to include any armaments.

Casualties

A total of 218 people were confirmed dead from the explosion, with over 7,000 people were injured. Foreigners from at least 22 countries were among the casualties. Also, several United Nations naval peacekeepers who were members of the UN Interim Force in Lebanon (UNIFIL) were injured by the blast. The United Nations High Commissioner for Refugees (UNHCR) reported that 34 refugees were among the dead and missing, and an additional 124 refugees were injured. At least 150 people became permanently disabled as a result of the explosion.

All ten members of Platoon 5, a team of nine firefighters and a paramedic, died at the scene of the blast. Nazar Najarian, the secretary-general of the Kataeb Party, died after sustaining severe head injuries. French architect Jean-Marc Bonfils died after sustaining serious injuries at his apartment in the East Village building in Mar Mikhaël. He had been live-streaming the fire at the warehouse on Facebook at the time. Lady Cochrane Sursock, philanthropist and member of the Sursock family, died on 31 August from injuries sustained from the blast.

Damage

The explosion overturned cars and stripped steel-framed buildings of their cladding. The grain elevator was largely destroyed, exacerbating food shortages caused by the COVID-19 pandemic and the financial crisis. About  of grain were lost, leaving the country with less than a month's worth of grain in reserve. However, part of the elevator's sturdy structure survived, shielding a large area of western Beirut from greater destruction.

The damage from the blast affected over half of Beirut, with the likely cost above US$15 billion and insured losses at around US$3 billion. Approximately ninety percent of the city's hotels were damaged and three hospitals completely destroyed, while two more suffered damage. Dozens of injured people brought to nearby hospitals could not be admitted because of the damage to the hospitals. Windows and other installations of glass across the city were shattered.

Four nurses died from the initial blast, fifteen patients died after their ventilators stopped working, and several child cancer patients were injured by flying glass. Within hours, after discharging all its patients and sending some to other facilities, Saint George Hospital was forced to close. The hospital's director of intensive care, Dr. Joseph Haddad, was quoted as saying: "There is no Saint George Hospital any more. It's fallen, it's on the floor... It's all destroyed. All of it."

The Sursock Museum was severely damaged, as was much of its artwork, and some ceramics were completely destroyed. The atelier for the fashion house Sandra Mansour was heavily damaged by the explosion. Sursock Palace, a 160-year-old Beirut landmark that was listed as a cultural heritage site, also sustained heavy damage, as did its many works of art. Bustros Palace, which hosts the Ministry of Foreign Affairs and Emigrants, was severely damaged.  The Armenian Catholicosate in Antelias sustained great damage. All the stained glass windows of the National Evangelical Church were blown out. The FIBA Asia headquarters was also heavily damaged. Embassies in and around Beirut reported varying degrees of damage to their buildings; the embassies of Argentina, Australia, Finland, Cyprus, and the Netherlands, which were close to the blast, sustained heavy damage, while minor damage was reported from the South Korean, Hungarian, Kazakh, Russian, Bulgarian, Romanian, and Turkish embassies.

Shipping
The cruise ship Orient Queen, berthed near Warehouse 12, suffered extensive damage and capsized overnight. Two members of the crew were killed, and seven crew members were injured. On 7 August, the first lawsuit related to the explosions was filed by the ship's owners, Abou Merhi Cruises, whose offices were also destroyed. The Bangladesh Navy corvette BNS Bijoy, which participated in UNIFIL, was also damaged.

The edible-oil tanker ship AmadeoII, being used as a bunker barge at the port, was nearest to the explosion, which deposited the mangled remains of the ship on a nearby quay. The ship's crew died in the explosion. Two large livestock carriers, Abou KarimI and Abou KarimIII, laid up at the end of Berth 09, very close to Warehouse 12, were heavily damaged. Abou KarimI became unstable, keeled over onto the adjacent Abou KarimIII and shortly afterwards capsized. The livestock carrier Jouri and the cargo ships Mero Star and Raouf H were also close to the blast and suffered serious damage; AIS from these ships stopped broadcasting at the time of the explosion.

Hapag-Lloyd's offices in Beirut were destroyed. CMA CGM's offices, located a few hundred meters away from the site of the explosion, were severely damaged. One employee died and two were severely injured.

Airport
Doors and windows were destroyed, and ceiling tiles were shaken loose by the shockwave, severing electrical wires. Despite the damage, flights continued.

Subsequent collapses 

In July 2022, grains remaining in the silo caught fire due to a combination of fermentation and summer heat. On 31 July, the northern part of the silo collapsed. Two further collapses occurred in August. The government had ordered the demolition of the silos in April 2022, but families of blast victims objected, saying it should be preserved as a memorial site.

Investigation
The government formed an investigative committee led by Prime Minister Hassan Diab, which announced it would submit its findings to the Council of Ministers of Lebanon by 11 August. The committee includes the justice, interior and defence ministers, and the head of the top four security agencies: the Armed Forces, General Security, Internal Security Forces, and State Security. The investigation was to examine whether the explosion was an accident or due to negligence, and if it was caused by a bomb or another external interference. President Michel Aoun rejected calls for an international probe despite demands from world leaders.

On 5 August, the Council agreed to place sixteen Beirut port officials who had overseen storage and security since 2014 under house arrest, overseen by the army, pending the investigation into the explosions. In addition, the general manager of the port, Hassan Koraytem, and the former director general of Lebanon's customs authority, Shafiq Merhi, were arrested. Later, on 17 August, the incumbent director-general of Lebanon's customs authority, Badri Daher, was also arrested. Also, former ministers of both finance and public works were due to be interrogated by a judge appointed by the council. In the meantime, state prosecutor Ghassan Oueidat ordered a travel ban on seven individuals, including Koraytem. While Acting Justice Minister Marie-Claude Najm unsuccessfully demanded an international investigation into the blast, she also noted that "...this case is a chance for the Lebanese judiciary to prove they can do their jobs and win back the confidence of the people". On 19 August, a Lebanon judge ordered the arrests of more suspects over the explosion, making the total number of accused 25.

The Lebanese judge Fadi Sawan, who has been responsible for the investigation, summoned former Minister of Transportation and Public Works Ghazi Aridi, Labor Ministers Ghazi Zaiter, Youssef Fenianos, and Michel Najjar, General Director of the Lebanese State Security Tony Saliba, Director General of Lebanon's Land and Maritime Transport division, Abdul-Hafeez Al-Qaisi, and General Director of General Security, Major General Abbas Ibrahim.

In September, Lebanon's state prosecution asked Interpol to detain two Russian citizens, the captain and the owner of Rhosus, as its cargo of ammonium nitrate was blamed for the explosion. In January 2021, Interpol issued Red Notices against the two Russians as well as a Portuguese man.

In December 2020, Lebanon's outgoing Prime Minister Diab and three former ministers were charged with negligence over the Beirut port explosion. The former ministers were former finance minister Ali Hassan Khalil, Ghazi Zeiter, and Youssef Fenianos, both former ministers of public works. Zeitar was transport and public works minister in 2014, followed by Fenianos in 2016, who held the job until the beginning of 2020. Khalil was finance minister in 2014, 2016, and until 2020.

On 28 January 2021, Syrian-Russian businessman George Haswani denied any links to the Beirut explosion. He told Reuters he did not know anything about a company linked to the process of buying a shipment of chemicals that exploded. In an interview with Reuters at his home in Damascus, Haswani said that he had resorted to the Cypriot company Interstatus to register his company, which is the same agent that registered the Savaro company, and that the agent company had moved the registration site of the two companies to the same address on the same day. However, Haswani said that he did not know anything about Savaro and that any links between it and his company are just a coincidence because the two companies have the same agent. As stated in previous reports, Reuters was unable to determine whether Haswani had anything to do with Savaro. Haswani said, "I don't know what other companies are registered by this Cypriot company, five or three or 70 or more... It is a fabricated media whirlwind. We don't know Savaro and we hadn't heard about them before this." Interstatus did not respond to a request for comment. Marina Psyllou, the director of the "Interstatus" company, was listed in the registration documents of the company (Savaro) as the only owner and director of the company, but she denied that she was the real manager of the company. She told Reuters in mid-January 2021 that the beneficial owner of the company was another person, whom she refused to identify. She added that Savaro was a dormant company that had never conducted business. Haswani said that he was not contacted by any investigators from Lebanon or any other country regarding the explosion and that he will soon work to file a legal case in Paris against media reports linking him to the explosion. He continued, "I am living my life normally and laughing because I am someone who knows well that I have nothing to do with this matter at all. Why would I worry?"

On 15 April 2021, six detained people were released, including two officers, although they were not allowed to travel out of Lebanon.

In September 2021, OCCRP published an investigation, which linked Savaro Limited to a Ukrainian company trading chemicals, directed by Ukrainian citizen Volodymyr Verbonol. The report also mentions that only 20% of the nitrate originally stored in the warehouse was actually left when it exploded, raising questions about what happened with the rest.

On 14 October 2021, six people were killed and at least 30 injured in a gunfire exchange in Beirut during protests by members of the Shia Amal and Hezbollah outside the Justice Palace, which demanded an end to the investigations led by Judge Tarek Bitar, for they deemed him as too much centered on their political allies.

On 21 November 2021, the BBC reported that legal groups representing victims of the blast had sent letters on three occasions to UN Secretary General Antonio Guterres requesting more information from UNIFIL, but had received no acknowledgment from the UN.

On 22 November 2021, the Lebanese Foreign Minister Abdallah Bouhabib announced that Lebanon received satellite images from Russia of the port from the day of the blast in 2020. These were the first official images made available from any foreign government.

Throughout 2022, the investigation stalled. As of 8 June, parliamentary immunity, as well as outstanding complaints and other procedural roadblocks initiated by two members of Parliament and former ministers (namely, Ali Hassan Khalil and Ghazi Zaiter), continued to prevent significant progress in the case.

Relief operations

The Lebanese Red Cross said every available ambulance from North Lebanon, Bekaa, and South Lebanon was being dispatched to Beirut to help patients. According to the agency, a total of 75 ambulances and 375 medics were activated in response to the explosions. Lebanese President Michel Aoun said the government would make up to 100billion pounds (US$66million) in aid available to support recovery operations. The ride-sharing app Careem offered free rides to and from hospitals and blood donation centers to anyone willing to donate blood. Volunteers removed debris while local business owners offered to repair damaged buildings for free in the absence of a state-sponsored cleanup operation. A temporary hospital was established in the city by the Iranian Red Crescent Society.

Health Minister Hamad Hasan requested that international aid be sent to Lebanon; a number of countries sent in food, medical supplies, field hospitals, medical workers, and rescue teams. On 9 August, a multinational summit hosted by France raised 253 million euros in aid. The money pledged was not to be given to the Lebanese government, but rather to the people of Lebanon through the United Nations, other international organizations, and non-governmental organizations. On 14 August, a $565 million appeal for Lebanon was launched by the United Nations, including initial recovery efforts, as well as immediate humanitarian aid.

In the first week after the explosion, civilians gathered in hundreds to volunteer to clean up the debris on the streets and inside homes and businesses in Gemmayze, Achrafieh, and Karantina neighborhoods. Many civil society organizations offered equipment and food to the volunteers, while many residents and businesses opened their homes and hotels for free to those who lost their homes in the blast.

UNESCO played a leading role in the rescue and reconstruction of historic buildings, with Blue Shield International assessing the damage to houses, museums and libraries, and the International Council of Museums providing expertise. Blue Shield International, the United Nations Interim Force in Lebanon and the Lebanese Armed Forces put together a project to secure and protect cultural assets. According to Karl von Habsburg, founding president of Blue Shield International, the protection of cultural property in Beirut was not only about securing buildings, but also about preventing looting and water damage, taking dangerous chemical substances into account. The efforts also included the restoration of schools.

On 6 August 2020, the Lebanese Forces Party's executive chairman Samir Geagea was the first politician to visit Beirut and launched from there a relief committee, Ground-0, under the leadership of the former minister Dr. May Chidiac to support in rebuilding Beirut. In December 2020, the committee achieved repairing 709 houses, assisted 5300 individuals and 2300 families, distributed 14000 food rations, made 2540 medical consultations, and provided 2030 individuals with medicine. In addition, the committee distributed more than 150 scholarships for Beirut schools' students.

Reactions

Domestic

Prime Minister Hassan Diab announced that 5 August, the day after the explosion, would be a national day of mourning. The Lebanese government declared a two-week state of emergency. President Aoun said the government would provide support to displaced people, and the Ministry of Health would meet the expense of treatment for the wounded. Marwan Abboud, the governor of Beirut, said he arrived at the scene to search for firefighters who were on the site attempting to control the fire that was raging before the second explosion. He broke down in tears on television, calling the event "a national catastrophe". "It resembles to what happened in Japan, in Hiroshima and Nagasaki. That's what [it] reminds me of. In my life, I haven't seen destruction on this scale," he said. Lebanese civilians from every region in Lebanon came to help by offering food, cleaning the streets, and helping NGOs.

Multiple members of the Lebanese parliament resigned in protest, including Marwan Hamadeh, Paula Yacoubian, all three Kataeb Party MPs, Neemat Frem, Michel Moawad, Dima Jamali, and Henri Helou. The Lebanese ambassador to Jordan, Tracy Chamoun, also resigned on live television. On the night of 6 August, the protests against the government that had been ongoing since the previous October resumed, with dozens of protestors near the parliament building calling for the resignation of Lebanese government officials. On 8August, Diab called for early elections, saying it would be the only way for the country to exit the crisis.

On 9 August, the information minister of Lebanon, Manal Abdel Samad and then environment minister, Damianos Kattar resigned, the first government resignations since the explosion. On 10 August, the justice minister, Marie-Claude Najm, also resigned, followed by the resignation of the entire Lebanese cabinet. Shortly after the resignation of the cabinet, Lebanese Prime Minister Hassan Diab stepped down from office. President Michel Aoun accepted the resignation of the government and the Prime Minister, and asked the government to stay on in a caretaker capacity until a new cabinet is formed.

Ground-0 Relief Committee, an initiative by the Lebanese Forces Party, launched a petition for an international investigation. The petition was signed by the relatives of the victims and the missing, by the injured as well as by those whose homes, businesses or establishments have been damaged. The document was sent to the UN Secretary General, Antonio Guterres, through his special coordinator for Lebanon, Ján Kubiš, in order to take the necessary steps to appoint an international commission of inquiry.

The Lebanese Forces Party MPs called for an international investigation into the causes of the double explosion at the port of Beirut on 4 August 2020. They asked the Secretary-General of the United Nations, António Guterres, on 22 February 2021 for the creation of an international commission to be established under the United Nations, which would be responsible for carrying out the investigations. The Members of Parliament Georges Okais, Imad Wakim, Eddy Abillammaaa and Fadi Saad, presented a petition to this effect to the United Nations Special Coordinator in Lebanon, Najat Rochdi.

International

Representatives of multiple countries, as well as the United Nations (UN), offered condolences. In addition to those countries which provided aid, others offered to do so. Notably, Israel offered aid via UN channels, as Israel and Lebanon have no diplomatic ties and are technically at war; the offer was refused by the Lebanese government. Former Israeli Member of Knesset Moshe Feiglin hailed the tragedy as a gift from God, celebrating the incident and describing it as a "spectacular firework show." Despite years of conflict, including the 2006 Lebanon War, both Israel and senior Hezbollah officials ruled out Israeli involvement in the explosion, despite claims and allegations spread via social media.

The International Charter on Space and Major Disasters was activated on 5August, thus providing for widespread usage of various corporate, national, and international satellite assets on a humanitarian basis. Several countries expressed solidarity by lighting up landmarks and monuments in the colors of the Lebanese flag, including the Tel Aviv City Hall, whereas the Eiffel Tower in Paris went dark at midnight, and the Arab League flew its flag at its headquarters in Cairo at half-mast. Some figures from the right-wing criticized the display of the flag of Lebanon, an "enemy state", in Tel Aviv. There was also backlash inside Lebanon against the Israeli gesture.

Following the explosion, the Netherlands, Turkey, and the United Kingdom sent search and rescue teams. Egypt sent several planes with tons of medical aid and food to Lebanon. The Egyptian embassy also established a field hospital. On 5 August 2020, Qatar started providing urgent medical aid. The Qatari Emiri Air Force delivered field hospitals, respirators, and generators to Beirut. In addition, Qatar's Emir Sheikh Tamim bin Hamad Al Thani donated US$50 million to Lebanon. On 6 August 2020, Kuwait provided 36 tonnes of urgent humanitarian and medical aid to Lebanon including wheelchairs, blood bags and 10 ambulances.

As a result of the explosion, concerns were raised about the storage of ammonium nitrate in other ports across the world. Large quantities of the chemical compound were removed from storage in Egypt, India, Romania, and Senegal.

In August 2021, a memorial event marking the one-year-anniversary of the explosion was held in tribute to the victims at the Port of Beirut, joined by UN officials and International Labour Organization Regional Director Ruba Jaradat.

In December 2021, the United Nations Economic Commission for Europe, United Nations Office for Disaster Risk Reduction, United Nations Office for the Coordination of Humanitarian Affairs, United Nations Environment Programme, Organisation for Economic Co-operation and Development, International Labour Organization, and International Maritime Organization held a seminar in follow-up to the explosion. National governments of Lebanon, Estonia, France, South Africa, and others shared lessons learned from the explosion. The seminar called for action to better manage the risks of chemicals in ports.

Conspiracy theories 
Numerous conspiracy theories emerged on social media in the days following the explosion. The main themes were that there was a significant weapons cache belonging to Hezbollah stored at the Port of Beirut, and that Israel wished to destroy those weapons. The theories said that Israel launched an attack and the level of destruction took them by surprise. Israel, Lebanon and Hezbollah all denied this theory, and blame the ammonium nitrate stored in the port.

See also

 List of 21st-century explosions
Largest artificial non-nuclear explosions
 List of industrial disasters
Halifax Explosion
Texas City disaster
2015 Tianjin explosions
2022 Sitakunda fire

Notes

References

External links

Beirut Explosion – in Pictures by The Guardian
In Pictures: Huge Explosion Rocks Beirut by CNN
Photos: Explosion Leaves Beirut in Shatters by NPR
The Lebanon Explosions in Photos by The New York Times
Explosion in Beirut: Photos From a City Still Reeling From the Blast by Time
Before and after satellite photos from CNN
Map of the Port of Beirut with several warehouses numbered, including Warehouse 12 next to the silos
Forensic Architecture overview
2020 Beirut, Lebanon Explosion Footage (Compilation)

 
2020 fires in Asia
2020 in Lebanon
2020 explosions
Ammonium nitrate disasters
Articles containing video clips
August 2020 events in Lebanon
Explosions in 2020
2020
Fires in Lebanon
Industrial fires and explosions
Maritime incidents in 2020
2020 disasters in Lebanon